The 2008 UAE 1st Speedcar Series round was a Speedcar Series motor race held on 25 and 26 January 2008 at Dubai Autodrome in Dubai, United Arab Emirates. It was the first round of the 2008 Speedcar Series. This round was declared a non-championship round as not all of the cars had been updated in time to the FIA crash standards.

Classification

Qualifying

Race 1

Race 2

See also 
 2008 UAE 1st GP2 Asia Series round

References

Speedcar Series
Speedcar